Fernandina Beach Municipal Airport  is a city-owned public-use airport located on Amelia Island three nautical miles (6 km) south of the central business district of Fernandina Beach, a city in Nassau County, Florida, United States. It is designated as a reliever airport for Jacksonville International Airport.

Fernandina Beach Municipal Airport was developed as a training facility by the United States Navy during World War II, serving as Outlying Field Fernadina Beach (OLF Fernadina Beach) to the Naval Air Station Jacksonville complex.  The airport was transferred to the City of Fernandina Beach in 1946 and is designated as a general aviation reliever airport for Jacksonville International Airport.  It is occasionally used as a practice airfield by U.S. Navy helicopters from NAS Jacksonville and Naval Station Mayport and by U.S. Coast Guard and Florida Army National Guard helicopters from Cecil Field.

Facilities and aircraft 
It has three paved runways: 4/22 is 5,301 by 100 feet (1,616 x 30 m); 13/31 is 5,152 by 100 feet (1,570 x 30 m); 9/27 is 5,000 by 100 feet (1,524 x 30 m).

For the 12-month period ending June 30, 2000, the airport had 47,000 aircraft operations, an average of 128 per day: 96% general aviation, 3% air taxi and 1% military. At that time there were 66 aircraft based at this airport: 76% single-engine, 17% multi-engine, 2% jet, 2% helicopter and 5% ultralight.

References

External links 
  brochure from CFASPP
 
 

Airports in Florida
Transportation buildings and structures in Nassau County, Florida
1940s establishments in Florida
Amelia Island